Mizutania is a genus of liverworts restricted to tropical Asia, and contains a single species Mizutania riccardioides. It is classified in order of Jungermanniales and is a member of the family of Calypogeiaceae within that order.

The genus name of Mizutania is in honour of Masami Mizutani (b.1930), who was a Japanese botanist (Bryology), who worked at the Hattori Botanical Laboratory.

The genus was circumscribed by Tatsuwo Furuki and Zennoske Iwatsuki in J. Hattori Bot. Lab. vol.67 on pages 291 and 294 in 1989.

References 

Jungermanniales
Jungermanniales genera
Monotypic bryophyte genera
Flora of Asia